Turbonilla conradi is a species of sea snail, a marine gastropod mollusk in the family Pyramidellidae, the pyrams and their allies.

Description
The large and stout shell is regularly coiled. Its color is dirty waxen gray. The shell grows to  a length of 12 mm. The prominent, nearly  flattened  protoconch is situated transverse to the  axis. The teleoconch contains 12, slightly convex whorls. The shell is ornamented with  coarse and  fine, incised, spiral lines on the intercostal spaces and base. The suture is well marked and slightly  undulating. There are about 22 transverse ribs. These are broad, rounded, straight, slightly oblique. They are separated by wider, shallow spaces crossed by 4  conspicuous, incised lines, and several indistinct, finer ones. One just above the suture forms a wide and deep groove, another similar one at the middle  of the whorls, on either side and well separated from this, a distinct line, the three forming a conspicuous  band. Above and below this there are other  indistinct lines which, under the microscope, number six on each space; two others also appear on each side of the median groove. The base of the shell is well-rounded, cut by three distinct, well-separated, incised, spiral lines and several finer ones below. The rounded aperture  is squarish. The columellar lip is straight, thickened, and well reflected.

Distribution
This species occurs in the following locations:
 Gulf of Mexico : Florida at depths between 0 m and 5 m.

References

External links
 To Biodiversity Heritage Library (7 publications)
 To Encyclopedia of Life
 To USNM Invertebrate Zoology Mollusca Collection
 To ITIS
 To World Register of Marine Species

conradi
Gastropods described in 1899